Nicolas Gestin (born 30 March 2000) is a French slalom canoeist who has competed at the international level since 2016. He is from Tréméven, Finistère in Brittany.

Career

Junior
Gestin began paddling with his local club, Canoë Kayak Club Quimperlé. He made his first junior team in 2016, finishing 5th individually at the Junior Worlds in Kraków, also earning a bronze in the C1 team event. Nicolas received €1,000 from the Quimperlé community to help finance international travel. He dislocated his shoulder in August 2016, resulting in him missing the 2016 Junior Europeans and selection for the 2017 team. Gestin's breakthrough season was his last as a junior, where he earned four medals and made two World Cup finals. At the 2018 Junior Europeans he won a silver medal in both C1 and C1 team, followed by a gold in C1 team and a bronze individually at the 2018 Junior Worlds in Ivrea.

U23
Gestin has won three medals at the U23 World Championships with two golds in C1 (2019, 2021) and a bronze in the C1 team event (2021). By winning the 2021 championship, Gestin became only the second athlete to win the title twice (after Roberto Colazingari) and the first to win it at consecutive events. Nicolas also won a gold medal in C1 at the 2019 U23 Europeans, an event which he did not compete in the following two years (in 2021 in order to prepare for the World Championships).

Senior
Nicolas' first races at the senior level were the last two World Cups of the 2018 season where he made both finals finishing 8th and 10th in Tacen and La Seu, respectively. He won a silver medal at the 2020 World Cup in Tacen. Gestin was coached by 1993 and 1995 vice world champion Anne Boixel until 2021 and now by French national team coach Arnaud Brogniart. He participated in the French selection trials for the 2020 Summer Olympics, finishing 6th. Gestin finished 5th at the 2021 European Championships in Ivrea.

He won a gold medal in the C1 team event at the 2021 World Championships in Bratislava, finishing 4th individually.

Gestin won the overall World Cup title in the C1 class in 2022.

Results

World Cup individual podiums

Complete World Cup results

Notes
No overall rankings were determined by the ICF, with only two races possible due to the COVID-19 pandemic.

Complete Championship results

References

External links

2000 births
Living people
French male canoeists
Medalists at the ICF Canoe Slalom World Championships